Lindsey N. Daugherty is an American attorney and politician serving as a member of the Colorado House of Representatives from the 24th district, which includes portions of Adams and Jefferson counties, including the communities of Arvada and Fairmount. Prior to reapportionment implemented in 2023, Daugherty represented the 29th district. First elected in 2020, she first assumed office on January 13, 2021.

Background 
Daugherty graduated from Thompson Valley High School in Loveland, Colorado. She earned a Bachelor of Arts degree in political science from the University of Northern Iowa and a Juris Doctor from the Sturm College of Law at the University of Denver. Daugherty has worked as an attorney and in the office of Representative Tracy Kraft-Tharp.

References 

Living people
Year of birth missing (living people)
People from Loveland, Colorado
Democratic Party members of the Colorado House of Representatives
Colorado lawyers
Women state legislators in Colorado
University of Northern Iowa alumni
University of Denver alumni
Sturm College of Law alumni
21st-century American women